Michael C. Farnworth  (born July 23, 1959) is a Canadian politician who has served as the 15th and current deputy premier of British Columbia since 2021, and the minister of public safety and solicitor general since 2017. A member of the British Columbia New Democratic Party (BC NDP), Farnworth represents the riding of Port Coquitlam in the Legislative Assembly of British Columbia, where he is the NDP's house leader, and the dean of the Legislative Assembly.

Background
Born in Bebington, England, Farnworth was raised in Port Coquitlam, British Columbia. He attended Simon Fraser University, earning a bachelor's degree in geography. Prior to entering elected office, Farnworth worked at CP Rail, Gulf Oil, and Mount Isa Mines.

Farnworth has publicly acknowledged that he is gay. He has had a relationship with his partner, Doug, for over twenty five years.

Political career
After serving three terms on Port Coquitlam City Council and working for Port Moody—Coquitlam Member of Parliament Ian Waddell, Farnworth ran for the BC NDP in the 1991 provincial election, in which he was first elected Member of the Legislative Assembly (MLA) for Port Coquitlam.

He was re-elected in 1996, and was appointed Minister of Municipal Affairs and Housing by Premier Glen Clark in January 1997, before becoming Minister of Employment and Investment and Minister Responsible for Housing in 1998. Under Premier Ujjal Dosanjh, Farnworth was named Minister of Health and Minister Responsible for Seniors in February 2000, before becoming Minister of Social Development and Economic Security in November that year.

He ran in the redistributed riding of Port Coquitlam-Burke Mountain in 2001, but lost his seat amidst the party's province-wide wipeout. Following the election, Farnworth worked in the Balkans and Iraq for the U.S.-based National Democratic Institute.

In the 2005 B.C. general election, Farnworth sought to take back his old seat, winning the riding with 11,844 votes (48.14% of valid votes). In 2009, he was re-elected to his fourth term in the recreated riding of Port Coquitlam with 54.71% of valid votes. He then ran in the 2011 NDP leadership election to replace outgoing leader Carole James; he lost to Adrian Dix after three rounds of voting.

Farnworth was returned to the legislature in the 2013 B.C. general election with more than half of the riding's popular vote, but the BC NDP lost the election despite favourable opinion polls leading up to the vote. Following Dix's resignation as party leader in September 2013, both Farnworth and John Horgan formally announced their candidacies for the post in March 2014. With a significant number of NDP MLAs backing Horgan (including Dawn Black, Joe Trasolini and Fin Donnelly, all figures from Farnworth's own Tri-Cities area), Farnworth withdrew from the leadership race in April, leaving Horgan the sole candidate. After the deadline for nominations passed on May 1, Horgan was acclaimed leader of the BC NDP, and appointed Farnworth as opposition house leader.

Farnworth was re-elected MLA in the 2017 B.C. general election with more than 55% of the vote. In the subsequent NDP minority government, Farnworth was appointed Minister of Public Safety and Solicitor General. He retained the same cabinet posts in the NDP majority government following his re-election in 2020.

On October 28, 2021, Farnworth was appointed Deputy Premier of British Columbia by Premier John Horgan, in the wake of an announcement that Horgan was to undergo throat surgery on October 29. When Horgan stepped down as premier and was succeeded by David Eby, Farnworth retained his portfolios in Eby's cabinet.

Electoral record

Notes

References

Living people
British Columbia New Democratic Party MLAs
Canadian LGBT people in provincial and territorial legislatures
English emigrants to Canada
Gay politicians
People from Port Coquitlam
Health ministers of British Columbia
Members of the Executive Council of British Columbia
British Columbia municipal councillors
Solicitors general of Canadian provinces
1959 births
20th-century Canadian politicians
21st-century Canadian politicians
Simon Fraser University alumni
People from Bebington
21st-century Canadian LGBT people
20th-century Canadian LGBT people
Canadian gay men